Carpathia or Kárpátia may refer to:

Geography and topography
 Carpathian Mountains, part of a mountain range in Europe
 Carpathian Ruthenia, a small historic region in Central Europe
 Montes Carpatus, a lunar mountain range
 Carpathian Basin, an alternative name for the Pannonian Basin
 Carpathia Seamount, a seamount in the North Atlantic Ocean

Media and entertainment

Characters
 Nicolae Carpathia, the fictional Antichrist and head of the Global Community in Left Behind
 Vigo the Carpathian, a character in Ghostbusters II

Fictional places
 Carpathia, a fictional Balkan kingdom in the 1957 film The Prince and the Showgirl
 Carpathia, a fictional Balkan kingdom ruled boy the villainous ghost Vigo in the 1989 film Ghostbusters II.
 Carpathia, a fictional planet on the British television series Outcasts
 Carpathia, a fictionalised version of Subcarpathian Rus that briefly proclaims independence in the 1972 novel The Lost Embassy by Adam Fergusson (Collins 1972, ISBN 0 00 221487 3)

Music
Carpathian Forest, a Black metal band from Norway
 Carpathia: A Dramatic Poem, a 2005 album by German band The Vision Bleak
 "Carpathia" (2005 single), a song on the album
 Carpathia, a song by American band Taking Back Sunday
 "Funeral in Carpathia", a song by British extreme metal band Cradle of Filth from the 1996 album Dusk and Her Embrace
 "Titanic Calls Carpathia", a song by the international Progressive Rock band The Tangent from their 2011 album Comm

Other
 Carpathia FC, an American soccer club in Sterling Heights, Michigan
 RMS Carpathia, a steamship that rescued survivors from the RMS Titanic on April 15, 1912
 Via Carpathia, a planned transnational highway network in Lithuania and Greece

See also
 Carpathian (disambiguation)
 Subcarpathia (disambiguation)
 Transcarpathia (disambiguation)}